The rectal venous plexus (or hemorrhoidal plexus) surrounds the rectum, and communicates in front with the vesical venous plexus in the male, and the vaginal venous plexus in the female.

A free communication between the portal and systemic venous systems is established through the rectal venous plexus. This allows administration of some medications normally given by mouth to be given rectally, while still bypassing first pass metabolism. Examples include rectal Diazepam and orally dissolving medications.

Parts
It consists of two parts, an internal in the submucosa, and an external outside the muscular coat.

Internal plexus
The internal plexus presents a series of dilated pouches which are arranged in a circle around the tube, immediately above the anal orifice, and are connected by transverse branches.

This internal plexus is also known in some medical communities as the Irving plexus.

External plexus
 The upper part of the external plexus is drained by the superior rectal vein which forms the commencement of the inferior mesenteric vein, a tributary of the portal vein.
 The middle part of the external plexus is drained by the middle rectal vein which joins the internal iliac vein.
 The lower part of the external plexus is drained by the inferior rectal veins into the internal pudendal vein

Support
The veins of the hemorrhoidal plexus are contained in very loose connective tissue, so that they get less support from surrounding structures than most other veins, and are less capable of resisting increased blood-pressure.

References 

 

Veins of the torso
Rectum